A Solicited-Node multicast address is an IPv6 multicast address used by the Neighbor Discovery Protocol to verify whether a given IPv6 address is already used by the local-link or not, through a process called DAD (Duplicate Address Detection). This allows NDP to assign IPv6 addresses to hosts using SLAAC (IPv6 Stateless Address Autoconfiguration) without the risk of assigning addresses already in use. The Solicited-Node multicast addresses are generated from the host's IPv6 unicast or anycast address, and each interface must have a Solicited-Node multicast address associated with it.

NDP sends out a Neighbor Solicitation message (ICMPv6 Type 135) to the Solicited-Node multicast address of the IPv6 unicast or anycast address it plans to assign using SLAAC, and if a host is present in that group, it will respond with a Neighbor Advertisement message (ICMPv6 Type 136), and NDP will know that the IPv6 unicast or anycast address it is trying to assign is already in use.

A Solicited-Node address is created by taking the least-significant 24 bits of a unicast or anycast address and appending them to the prefix .

Example 

Its Solicited-Node multicast address will be .

fe80::2aa:ff:fe28:9c5a                      IPv6 unicast/anycast address (compressed notation)
fe80:0000:0000:0000:02aa:00ff:fe28:9c5a     IPv6 unicast/anycast address (uncompressed notation)
                                -- ----     the least-significant 24-bits
ff02::1:ff00:0/104                          Solicited-Node multicast address prefix
ff02:0000:0000:0000:0000:0001:ff00:0000/104 (uncompressed)
---- ---- ---- ---- ---- ---- --            The first 104 bits
ff02:0000:0000:0000:0000:0001:ff28:9c5a     Solicited-Node multicast address (uncompressed notation)
ff02::1:ff28:9c5a                           Solicited-Node multicast address (compressed notation)

References 

IPv6
Network addressing